The Rip Curl Pro Bells Beach 2019 was the second event of the Men's Championship Tour in the 2019 World Surf League. It took place from 17 to 27 April in Bells Beach, Victoria, and was contested by 36 surfers.

In the final, John John Florence of Hawaii defeated Brazil's Filipe Toledo to win his sixth Championship Tour event, and his first at Bells Beach.

Format

A new competition format was introduced for the 2019 Championship Tour. All 36 surfers take part in the Seeding Round. The top two surfers in each heat advance directly to the Round of 32, while the lowest-placed surfer in each heat enters the Elimination Round. In each of the four heats in the Elimination Round, the top two surfers advance to the Round of 32, while the lowest-placed surfer is eliminated from the competition. From the Round of 32 onwards, the competition follows a single elimination format, with the winner of each head-to-head heat advancing to the next round and the loser being eliminated.

Competition

The competition took place from 17 to 27 April.

Seeding Round

Elimination round

Round of 32

Round of 16

Quarterfinals

Semifinals

Final

References

External links

 World Surf League

2019 World Surf League
Surfing competitions
2019 in Australian sport
Sports competitions in Victoria (Australia)
April 2019 sports events in Australia